N – The Madness of Reason is a 2014 Belgian documentary film written (in collaboration with Ben Okri) and directed by Peter Krüger.

Synopsis
The film explores the life of Raymond Borremans, a freewheeling Parisian musician turned encyclopedia enthusiast whose fascination with the history and customs of West Africa lead to his compiling a book on the subject. Encyclopédie Borremans was left uncompleted on his death in 1988, at the age of 82. He got to the letter "N", hence the film's name. N – The Madness of Reason combines elements of documentary, biopic, and fiction.

Cast
The film's cast includes Michael Lonsdale (narrator), Abiba Sawadogo, Hamadoun Kassogue, and Vieux Farka Touré.

Release
The film was screened at several film festivals in 2014 and was slated for general release on February 8, 2014.

N - The Madness of Reason received three nominations at the 2015 Ostend Film Festival, winning the Ensor Award for Best Film (for the director Peter Krüger), the Ensor Award for Best Editing (for the editor Nico Leunen), and the Ensor Award for Best Music (for the composer Walter Hus). At the 2014 Cine Migrante International Film Festival in Brasília, the film won the 2014 Jury Award for Best Film.

References

External links
 
 Official Trailer (YouTube) - Duration: 3 minutes, 21 seconds
 Official Trailer (Vimeo) - Duration: 2 minutes, 30 seconds
 Official Official Website Inti Films (producer)

2014 films
2010s French-language films
Docufiction films
Belgian documentary films
Films set in Mali
Films set in France